The crested toad or double crested toad (Ingerophrynus biporcatus) is a species of toad in the family Bufonidae.
It is endemic to Indonesia.
Its natural habitats are subtropical or tropical moist lowland forests, rivers, plantations, rural gardens, and heavily degraded former forest.
It is threatened by habitat loss.

References

Ingerophrynus
Amphibians of Indonesia
Amphibians described in 1829
Taxa named by Johann Ludwig Christian Gravenhorst
Taxonomy articles created by Polbot